Tulamba (also Tulambah) is a small town in Punjab, Pakistan. Tulamba is situated on the eastern edge of the Ravi River, between the cities of Abdul Hakeem and Mian Channu. Prior to 1985 Tulamba belonged to the district of Multan, but in 1985 it was included within Mian Channu Tehsil in the newly formed Khanewal District. Tulamba's population is nearly 50,000. The spoken language is Rachnavi Punjabi. A native of Tulamba is referred to as a Tulmabvi.

History

Tulamba is more than 2,500 years old. Archaeological digs have uncovered four distinct layers, belonging to the Hindu, Buddhist, Muslim, Sikh civilisations. The coins of several prior governments have been excavated here.

Tulamba saw the influence of several Mahajanapada of ancient India, mainly Gandhara, Kamboja and Magadha. By 400-300 BCE, the region came under the influence of several Magadha dynasties of eastern India. The first was that of the Nanda Empire of ancient India from 300 BCE, and with the rise of Chandragupta Maurya, the region came under the complete control of the Mauryan Empire. After the victory of the Mauryan Empire against the Greeks in the Seleucid–Mauryan war, much of the region came under the rule of Chandragupta Maurya of ancient India. Chandragupta and Seleucus made a peace settlement in 304 BCE. Selecucus Nucator ceded the satrapies, including those in Chitral to the expanding Mauryan Empire. The alliance was solidified with a marriage between Chandragupta Maurya and a princess of the Seleucid Empire. The outcome of the arrangement proved to be mutually beneficial. The border between the Seleucid and Mauryan Empires remained stable in subsequent generations, and friendly diplomatic relations are reflected by the ambassador Megasthenes, and by the envoys sent westward by Chandragupta's grandson Ashoka. Afterward, the region was briefly and nominally controlled by the Shunga Empire. However, with the decline of the Shungas, the region passed to local Hindu and Buddhist rulers, and interrupted by foreign rulers. Many of these foreign rulers, like the Indo-Parthians, Sakas, and Kushans converted to Hinduism and Buddhism, and promoted these Indian religions throughout Central and South Asia. The region reached its height under the Buddhist ruler Kanishka the Great. After the fall of the Kushans, the region came under the control of the Gupta Empire of ancient India. During the period, Hindu and Buddhist art and architecture flourished in the area.

They are in generally poor condition due to rain and neglect, although their bricks are still visible. When Dr. Sayyed Zahid Ali Wasti visited Tulamba in 1967, he saw the ruins spread over an area of several miles, including a walled fort with a high tower and a three-thousand-year-old protective trench around the fort. He described the walls as beautifully plastered with mud, and floors that were not solid. Most of what he described in 1967 is now outdated as the ruins have since been further destroyed and eroded. The trench, however, was renovated in 1988 using trenchers to repair the damaged sections.

According to early archeologists from the Archaeological Survey of India, during the British Indian Empire, they found strong fortresses left from the previous Hindu and Buddhist civilisations. There was a giant city, which was in use during the Hindu Shahi era, protected by a fort, which was over 1,000 square feet. The outer rampart was of earth, and it was 200 feet thick walls and 20 feet high. The fort was maintained by Hindu and Buddhist kings, until the arrival of Islam. The fort and the city was sacked by Muslim Timur, since then the city and the fort fell into ruin.

Religious significance
Guru Nanak, the first Sikh Guru, came here during his travels. Guru Har Rai, the Seventh Sikh Master, sent a masand (preacher) to preach Sikhism to the local people of this area.

The Muslims history of Tulamba began when Muhammad bin Qasim came to Tulamba on his way to Multan. The place he passed is now known as Qasim Bazar.

Military history

The people of Tulamba have encountered many armies in the city's history as a result of its geographic position. Armies coming from the north and west had to pass through Tulamba to get to the strategic city of Multan. Alexander the Great came to Tulamba when he invaded the Indian sub-continent. At that time Tulamba was ruled by the Moi people, who fought Alexander's forces.

The ancestor of the Mughals, Taimur-e-Lang, also invaded Tulamba, at that time called Tulma.

Sher Shah Suri built a fort in the center of the city. The boundary wall and some parts of the original building are still present. The fort is now occupied by the girls higher secondary school and the offices of the town committee.
Now Here also available Tulamba Punblic Church , as know as a catholic Church Tulamba which was started by Sohail Masih ..

Geography and climate

The climate of Tulamba is variable. The summer season is very hot, followed by a series of heavy rains. The winter season is very cold and often foggy.

Culture
Tulamba is a formal Punjabi city. The normal dress is the shalwar kameez, with the dhoti also popular. Older people wear the pagri or safa on their head. All the houses are built with solid bricks and concrete. The lifestyle is modern, and the use of electric and electronic equipments are common.

The main occupations are farming and trading. Many people work for the government or in the private sector.

Sites of interest
The ruins of the ancient city are situated on the edge of the modern city. The Sidhnai Canal and a point on the edge of the Ravi river are also used for recreation. Other sites of interest are Darbar Mamon Sheer Bukhari and Darbar Rehmat Ali Shah.

Educational institutions
Tulamba is home to many educational facilities, including  Government higher secondary schools for girls and boys, a Government High School for boys, a government college for woman, two government middle schools, and a primary school. The first private school, Star Modal Middle School Tulamba, was established in 1985,  The Educators school, a project of  Beacon house School System, established in March 2013 which is the largest educational network of Pakistan. The Educators is providing quality education in Tulamba town.

Additional facilities include Minhaj Model school, established in 1997, a divisional public school, and Husnain grammar school.

About twenty private schools are present in various locations, most of them being are English or Islamic. The Islamic educational institutes located in Tulamba are Madrisa Qadria, Darbar Rehmat Ali Shah, Imam Bargah Hussainia, and Daraluloom Syed Niaz Ahmed Shah Sahin.

Transport

The N-5 National Highway, a 15 minutes drive from Tulamba, provides the primary road link for Tulamba, giving easy access to Multan and Lahore.

Multan can also be reached through Abdul Hakeem, as well as through Makhdoom Pur and Kabirwala.

The M-4 Motorway is under construction and will pass near Tulamba, linking it to Multan and Islamabad. As of July, 2014 foundations for the embankment are being dug using trenchers, and the road is expected to be laid by mid-2015.

Facilities
The facilities of fresh water, electricity, gas, telephone and internet are available in Tulamba. A government hospital and six private hospitals are located in the city, as well as a  veterinary hospital to treat livestock, and an artificial insemination centre situated at Thana Road, Here also available Tulamba Punblic Church , as know as a catholic Church Tulamba .

Agriculture
There the average yield of crops is very good: 3120 kg of rice yield per acre was recorded last year. The main crops are rice, wheat, corn, sugar cane, cotton, and vegetables such as tomato, carrot, potato, radish, cabbage, onion, brinjal, and okra. The people of Kalupitra are fond of agricultural farming, though cattle farming is also popular, with many varieties of buffalo and cows kept.

Notable People
 Maulana Tariq Jameel, Islamic scholar (b. 1953)

References

Ancient Indian cities
Archaeological sites in Punjab, Pakistan
Bronze Age Asia
Populated places in Khanewal District